Advanced Small Arms Industries AG or ASAI is a Swiss firearms manufacturer. Products manufactured include the One Pro 45 and One Pro 9.

References

External links

Firearm manufacturers of Switzerland